Anson Rood (September 23, 1827January 17, 1898) was an American businessman, farmer, Republican politician, and Wisconsin pioneer.  He served three non-consecutive terms in the Wisconsin State Assembly between 1857 and 1872.

Biography

Born in Jericho, Vermont, Rood moved with his parents to Chicago, Illinois, in 1837, and then to Joliet, Illinois. In 1841, Rood moved to Wisconsin Territory. He served in the 38th Wisconsin Infantry Regiment during the American Civil War and was a quartermaster. Rood served on the Stevens Point, Wisconsin, Common Council and was president of the council from 1850 to 1860. Rood served in the Wisconsin State Assembly in 1857, 1864, and 1871. Sometime after 1871, Rood moved to Randolph, Iowa, to a farm and was President of the Nebraska City, Sidney and North Eastern Railroad. He died in Randolph, Iowa.

References

1827 births
1898 deaths
People from Fremont County, Iowa
People from Jericho, Vermont
People from Stevens Point, Wisconsin
People of Wisconsin in the American Civil War
Businesspeople from Iowa
Wisconsin city council members
Members of the Wisconsin State Assembly
19th-century American politicians
19th-century American businesspeople